This is a list of individual awards achieved by the North Melbourne Football Club since its foundation in 1869.

Individual honours

Tassie Medal
1958 – Allen Aylett

Norm Smith Medal
1996 – Glenn Archer
1999 – Shannon Grant

Brownlow Medal
1965 – Noel Teasdale
1973 – Keith Greig
1974 – Keith Greig
1978 – Malcolm Blight
1983 – Ross Glendinning

Michael Tuck Medal
1995 – Mick Martyn
1998 – Wayne Carey

EJ Whitten Medal
 1999 – Brent Harvey

Graham Moss Medal
 1998 – Peter Bell

Simpson Medal
 1960 – Allen Aylett

Jim Stynes Medal
 2003 – Brent Harvey

Lou Richards Medal
 2007 – Brent Harvey
 2008 – Brent Harvey

Leigh Matthews Trophy
1995 – Wayne Carey
1996 – Corey McKernan
1998 – Wayne Carey

Jock McHale Medal
1975 – Ron Barassi
1977 – Ron Barassi
1996 – Denis Pagan
1999 – Denis Pagan

Gardiner Medal
1932 – A. Frankie
1945 – W. Arthur
1951 – N. Doolan
1961 – J. O'Brien
1970 – M. Redenbach
1977 – D. Schimmelbusch
1996 – T. Nichols

Morrish Medal
1950 – N. Alford
1958 – N. Bowler
1964 – P. Gowans
1972 – I. Kilmartin
1978 – S. Simpson
1984 – A. Libertore
1986 – D. Ross
1987 – W. Schwass
1988 – T. McGrath
1990 – C. Watson

AFLPA Best First Year Player Award
2003 – Daniel Wells

Marn Grook Award
2004 – Daniel Wells

Robert Rose Award
1998 – Glenn Archer
1999 – Glenn Archer
2002 – Glenn Archer
2003 – Glenn Archer
2005 – Glenn Archer
2006 – Glenn Archer

Madden Medal
2007 – Glenn Archer

Herald Sun Player of the Year Award
2008 – Brent Harvey

Norm Goss Medal
2008 – Josh Smith

Polly Farmer Medal
2008 – Matt Campbell

Jack Titus Award
1978 – Jack Adams
1986 – Jim Hannan
1990 – John Dugdale
1993 – Keith McKenzie
1999 – Laurie Dwyer

Jason McCartney Medal
2008 – Drew Petrie

Archer-Hird Medal
2009 – Brent Harvey

Rising Star

Rising Star Award
1998 – Byron Pickett

Rising Star Nominees
1993 – Glenn Archer
1994 – Corey McKernan
1995 – Stuart Anderson; Matthew Capuano 
1996 – Peter Bell; Adam Simpson
1998 – Evan Hewitt; Byron Pickett
2000 – Adam Lange
2001 – Daniel Harris
2003 – Daniel Motlop; Daniel Wells
2004 – Michael Firrito
2006 – Brad Moran; Andrew Swallow
2007 – Scott McMahon; Jesse Smith
2008 – Gavin Urqhart
2009 – Jack Ziebell
2010 – Ryan Bastinac; Sam Wright
2013 – Aaron Mullett
2014 – Luke McDonald

Mark and Goal of the Year

Mark of the Year
1978 – Phil Baker
1991 – Brett Allison
1998 – Winston Abraham
2016 - Majak Daw

Goal of the Year
1976 – Keith Greig
1978 – Phil Baker
1986 – Jim Krakouer
1988 – Matthew Larkin
2004 – Daniel Wells

Goalkickers

Association Top Goalkicker
1885 – G. Houstone 38 goals
1910 – Frank Caine 75 goals
1918 – Tom Stevens 54 goals

Leading Goalkicker Medal
1941 – Sel Murray 88 goals

Coleman Medal
1972 – Doug Wade 103 Goals
1982 – Malcolm Blight 103 Goals
1990 – John Longmire 98 Goals

Team of the Century

AFL Team of the Century
 Keith Greig (wing)

Indigenous Team of the Century
 Barry Cable (coach)
 Jim Krakouer (forward pocket)
 Byron Pickett (interchange)

Greek Team of the Century
 Andrew Demetriou (wing)
  Arthur Karanicolas
 Dr Con Mitropoulos (doctor)

Italian Team of the Century
 Ron Barassi (coach)
 Saverio Rocca (full forward)

All Australians

Sporting Life Team of the Year
1949 – Les Foote
1954 – John Brady

National All Australians
1958 – Allan Aylett; John Dugdale
1961 – Allan Aylett
1966 – Noel Teasdale
1969 – Peter Steward
1979 – Graeme Cornes; Darryl Sutton
1980 – Darryl Sutton
1983 – Keith Greig; Stephen McCann; Ross Glendinning

V/AFL Teams of the Year
1982 – Malcom Blight; Gary Dempsey; Ross Glendinning
1983 – Ross Glendinning
1984 – Ross Glendinning; Kym Hodgeman
1986 – Jim Krakouer
1987 – Jim Krakouer
1988 – Matthew Larkin
1990 – John Longmire

AFL All Australians
1993 – Wayne Carey (captain)
1994 – Wayne Carey
1995 – Wayne Carey
1996 – Glenn Archer; Wayne Carey; Corey McKernan
1997 – David King
1998 – Wayne Carey (captain); Glenn Archer; David King; Anthony Stevens
1999 – Wayne Carey (captain); Peter Bell; Byron Pickett; Denis Pagan (coach)
2000 – Wayne Carey (captain); Brent Harvey
2002 – Glenn Archer; Adam Simpson
2005 – Shannon Grant; Brent Harvey
2007 – Brent Harvey
2008 – Brent Harvey
2011 - Drew Petrie
2013 - Scott Thompson
2015 - Todd Goldstein

Representative sides

State representatives

1879 – Arthur Ley (VFA); Frank Lording (VFA); Billy McLean (VFA); Jimmy Robertson (VFA)
1881 – Levy (VFA); Ley (VFA); Frank Lording (VFA); Neeley (VFA); Patterson (VFA); Shaw (VFA); Walker (VFA); Wedd (VFA)
1891 – L. Carroll (VFA)
1924 – John Lewis (VFA vice-captain)
1925 – John Lewis (VFL); Dave Walsh (VFL)
1926 – John Lewis (VFL); Curly Linton (VFL); Bill Russ (VFL); Dave Walsh (VFL)
1927 – Leo Dwyer (VFL) ;Bill Russ (VFL); Dave Walsh (VFL)
1928 – Leo Dwyer (VFL)
1929 – Charles Cameron (VFL); Leo Dwyer (VFL)
1930 – Charles Cameron (VFL); John Lewis (VFL)
1931 – Charles Cameron (VFL); John Lewis (VFL)
1932 – Charles Cameron (VFL); Charlie Gaudion (VFL); Jonny Gregory(VFL); John Lewis (VFL)
1933 – Jimmy Adamson (VFL); Selwyn Baker (VFL); Charlie Gaudion (VFL); George Kennedy (VFL); Jack Wrout (VFL)
1934 – Charlie Gaudion (VFL); Jack Wrout (VFL)
1935 – Charlie Gaudion (VFL); John Lewis (VFL)
1936 – Charlie Gaudion (VFL captain)
1937 – Wally Carter (VFL); Roy Deller (VFL); Ted Ellis (VFL)
1938 – Jock Cordner (VFL)
1939 – Jimmy Adamson (VFL); Jock Cordner (VFL); George Kennedy (VFL); Sel Murray (VFL)
1941 – Sel Murray (VFL); Frank Stubbs (VFL)
1945 – Alan Crawford (VFL); Bill Findlay(VFL)
1946 – Syd Dyer (VFL); Les Foote (VFL)
1947 – Kevin Dynon (VFL); Les Foote (VFL)
1948 – Kevin Dynon (VFL); Keith McKenzie (VFL)
1949 – Kevin Dynon (VFL); Les Foote (VFL); Jock Lineen (VFL); Jock McCorkell (VFL)
1950 – Les Foote (VFL); Ted Jarrard (VFL)
1951 – Bob Brooker (VFL); Les Foote (VFL); Ted Jarrard (VFL); Keith McKenzie (VFL); Les Reeves (VFL)
1952 – Vic Lawrence (VFL); Les Mogg (VFL); Jock Spencer (VFL)
1953 – Kevin Dynon (VFL); Ted Jarrard (VFL)
1954 – John Brady (VFL); Neil Doolan (VFL)
1955 – Kevin McMahon (VFL); Jock Spencer (VFL)
1956 – Kevin McMahon (VFL); Jock Spencer (VFL)
1957 – Allen Aylett (VFL); John Brady (VFL); Gerald Eastmure (VFL); Neil Doolan (VFL); Bryan Martyn (VFL)
1958 – Allen Aylett (VFL); John Dugdale (VFL); Noel Teasdale (VFL)
1959 – Allen Aylett (VFL); John Brady (VFL); Jack Eadwards (VFL); Gerald Eastmure (VFL); Albert Mantello (VFL); Noel Teasdale (VFL)
1960 – Allen Aylett (VFL); John Dugdale (VFL); Laurie Dwyer (VFL); Gerald Eastmure (VFL); Noel Teasdale (VFL); John Waddington (VFL)
1961 – Allen Aylett (VFL); Noel Teasdale (VFL)
1962 – Keith Robertson (VFL)
1963 – Allen Aylett (VFL); Noel Teasdale (VFL)
1964 – John Ibrahim (VFL); John Waddington (VFL)
1965 – Tom Allison (VFL) Noel Teasdale (VFL)
1966 – Alan Killigrew (VFL coach); Michael Gaudion (VFL); Bob Pascoe (VFL); Noel Teasdale (VFL)
1967 – Laurie Dwyer (VFL); Peter Steward (VFL); Noel Teasdale (VFL)
1968 – Peter Steward (VFL)
1969 – Sam Kekovich (Vic); Peter Steward (VFL)
1970 – Bernie McCarthy (VFL); Peter Steward (VFL)
1971 – Keith Greig (VFL); Denis Pagan (VFL)
1972 – Keith Greig (VFL)
1973 – Barry Davis (VFL captain); David Dench (VFL); Keith Greig (VFL); John Rantall (VFL)
1974 – Arnold Briedis (VFL); Keith Greig (VFL); John Rantall (VFL)
1975 – Malom Blight (VFL); Keith Greig (VFL)
1976 – Barry Cable (VFL)
1977 – Malcom Blight (Vic); John Bryne (Vic); John Cassin (Vic); David Dench (Vic); Ross Henshaw (Vic); Stephen Icke (Vic)
1978 – Keith Greig (Vic captain); Malcom Blight (Vic); Peter Keenan (Vic); Ken Montgomery (Vic); Wayne Schimmelbusch (Vic)
1979 – Malcom Blight (Vic captain); Darryl Sutton (Tas captain); Wayne Schimmelbusch (Vic SoS captain); Grame Cornes (SA)
1980 – Arnold Briedis (Vic); Gary Dempsey (Vic); Keith Greig (Vic); Stephen McCann (Vic); Wayne Schimmelbusch (Vic);  Darryl Sutton (Tas)
1981 – Malcom Blight (Vic captain); Gary Dempsey (Vic); Ross Glendinning (Vic); Wayne Schimmelbusch (Vic)
1982 – Ross Glendinning (Vic); Stephen McCann (Vic); Wayne Schimmelbusch (Vic)
1983 – Andrew Demetriou (Vic); David Dench (Vic); Ross Glendinning (Vic); Keith Greig Vic); Stephen McCann (Vic); Wayne Schimmelbusch (Vic)
1984 – Ross Glendinning (Vic); Keith Greig Vic); Stephen McCann (Vic)
1987 –  Schimmelbusch (Vic captain); Matthew Larkin (Vic); 
1988 – Brett Allison (ACT); Ross Smith (Vic) Matthew Larkin (Vic)
1989 – Matthew Larkin (Vic); Mick Martyn(Vic); Wayne Schwass (Vic)
1990 – Brett Allison (Vic); Wayne Carey (NSW); Michael Gallagher (Vic); John Longmire (NSW); Mick Martyn (Vic); Jose Romero (Vic)
1991 – Peter German (Vic); Matthew Larkin (Vic) Anthony Rock (Vic); Craig Sholl (Vic)
1992 – Wayne Carey (SA); Craig Sholl (Vic)
1993 – Wayne Carey (NSW captain); Brett Allison (NSW); Ben Buckley (Tasmania); Alex Ischenko (WA); Dean Laidley (WA); John Longmire (NSW); Mark Roberts (NSW); Anthony Rock (Vic); Wayne Schwass (Vic); Ross Smith (Vic)
1994 – Craig Sholl (Vic)
1995 – Brett Allison (Allies); Dean Laidley (WA); Wayne Schwass (Vic); Anthony Stevens (Vic)
1996 – Gleen Archer (Vic), Dean Laidley (WA); Corey McKernan (Vic); Anthony Stevens (Vic)
1997 – Brett Allison (Allies); Glenn Archer (Vic); Anthony Stevens (Vic)
1999 – Brent Harvey (Vic); David King (Vic)
2008 – Brent Harvey (Vic)

International representatives

1967 – John Dugdale; Laurie Dwyer
1968 – Daryl O'Brien; John Dugdale
1984 – Ross Glendinning
1990 – Brett Allison
1998 – Wayne Carey (Captain); Anthony Stevens
1999 – Wayne Carey (Captain); Peter Bell; Anthony Stevens
2000 – Brent Harvey; David King
2001 – Brent Harvey; David King
2002 – Adam Simpson
2003 – Brent Harvey; Jess Sinclair; Adam Simpson; Daniel Wells
2004 – Brady Rawlings
2005 – Brent Harvey; Shannon Grant; Troy Makepeace; Daniel Wells
2008 – Brent Harvey (Captain); Matt Campbell; Michael Firrito (Goalkeeper); Drew Petrie; Daniel Wells

Australian Football Hall of Fame

Legends
 Ron Barassi
 Malcolm Blight
 Barry Cable
 Russell Ebert

Coaches
 John Kennedy, Sr.

Players
 Glenn Archer
 Allen Aylett
 Wayne Carey
 Barry Davis
 Gary Dempsey 
 David Dench
 Wels Eicke
 Tom Fitzmaurice
 Les Foote
 Ross Glendinning
 Keith Greig
 Brent Harvey
 John Rantall
 Wayne Schimmelbusch
 Anthony Stevens
 Noel Teasdale 
 Doug Wade
 Johnny Lewis

Media
 Ron Casey

Club Records

Greatest winning margins

Unbeaten streaks

Individual Records

Most goals in a game

Most goals in a season

Games record

Over 250 games
Brent Harvey 432 (1996–2016)
Drew Petrie 316 (2001–16)
Glenn Archer 311 (1992–2007)
Wayne Schimmelbusch 306 (1973–1987)
Adam Simpson 306 (1995–2009)
Keith Greig 294 (1971–85)
Anthony Stevens 292 (1989–2004)
Mick Martyn 287 (1988–2002)
Todd Goldstein 286 (2008–)
David Dench 275 (1969–84)
Michael Firrito 275 (2003–16)
Jack Ziebell 252 (2009–)

(Updated during 2022 season)

Leading goalkickers
671 Wayne Carey (1989–2001)
518 Brent Harvey (1996–2016)
511 John Longmire (1988–95; 1997–99)
475 Jock Spencer (1948–57)
444 Malcolm Blight (1974–82)
428 Drew Petrie (2001–16)
411 Sel Murray (1937–44; 1948)
358 John Dugdale (1955–70)
354 Wayne Schimmelbusch (1973–87)
352 Bill Findlay (1935–45)
325 Lindsay Thomas (2007–2017)
321 Sid Dyer (1937–47)

(Up to end of 2017 season)

References
 http://afl.allthestats.com
 Dowling, G. (1997) The North Story – Official history of the North Melbourne Football Club

North Melbourne Football Club
North Melbourne Football Club individual awards and records
North Melbourne Football